Richard Henry Rush was an American cavalry colonel of English origin who led the 6th Pennsylvania Cavalry Regiment throughout the early and middle battles of the American Civil War.

Biography

Early years
Rush was born on 14 January 1825 at London as the grandson of Benjamin Rush and while his father was the minister of the Court of St. James.< At some point, Rush immigrated to Philadelphia and then entered the United States Military Academy before graduating 26th out of 59 on the Class of 1846. He then served in the Mexican-American War as a Brevet 2nd Lieutenant in the 2nd United States Artillery. After the war, Rush was stationed at Fort Columbus in 1848 and later at Fort Monroe from 1848 to 1849 and 1850. From 10 December 1850 to 5 November 1852, he was a part of the Coast Survey and from 1852 to 1854, he was stationed at Fort McHenry. However Rush resigned on 1 July 1854 and wouldn't re-enlist until the start of the American Civil War.

American Civil War
After the outbreak of the American Civil War, Rush was promoted to Colonel on 27 July 1861 and was authorized by Andrew Gregg Curtin to muster the 6th Pennsylvania Cavalry Regiment from Montgomery County and Berks County with a term of three years. The unit saw its first fighting at the Skirmish of Hanley's Bridge. It went on to participate in the battles of Hanover Court House, Gaines's Mill, White Oak Swamp, Malvern Hill, South Mountain, Antietam, Stoneman's 1863 raid, Fredericksburg, Chancellorsville and Gettysburg with their most distinguished service at the Battle of Brandy Station. George B. McClellan commented on the unit stating: "They are the eyes and ears of my army." Rush was seconded to the Provost Marshal General's Bureau from 10 May – 10 November 1863. There he helped to organize the Veteran Reserve Corps and afterwards, from 10 November – 20 December 1863, the Rock Island Prison. Rush was then made President of a Board for Examination of Officers from 3 January – 20 March 1864 but due to his term expiring, he resigned from the Army on 1 July 1864.

Nothing is known about Rush's life after the American Civil War besides his death date at 17 October 1893 and his burial at Laurel Hill Cemetery.

References

1825 births
1893 deaths
American military personnel of the Mexican–American War
People of Pennsylvania in the American Civil War
Union Army colonels
Military personnel from London
United States Military Academy alumni
English emigrants to the United States